Thomas William Roberts (8 March 185614 September 1931) was an English-born Australian artist and a key member of the Heidelberg School art movement, also known as Australian impressionism.

After studying in Melbourne, he travelled to Europe in 1881 to further his training, and returned home in 1885, "primed with whatever was the latest in art". A leading proponent of painting en plein air, he joined Frederick McCubbin in founding the Box Hill artists' camp, the first of several plein air camps frequented by members of the Heidelberg School. He also encouraged other artists to capture the national life of Australia, and while he is best known today for his "national narratives"—among them Shearing the Rams (1890), A break away! (1891) and Bailed Up (1895)—he earned a living as a portraitist, and in 1903 completed the commissioned work The Big Picture, the most famous visual representation of the first Australian Parliament.

Life

Roberts was born in Dorchester, Dorset, England, although some mystery surrounds his actual birthdate: his birth certificate says 8 March 1856, whereas his tombstone is inscribed 9 March.

Roberts migrated with his family to Australia in 1869 to live with relatives. Settling in Collingwood, a suburb of Melbourne, Victoria. He worked as a photographer's assistant through the 1870s, while studying art at night under Louis Buvelot and befriending others who were to become prominent artists, notably Frederick McCubbin.

During this period, his mother had remarried to a man whom Roberts did not get on with. He hence decided to further his art studies, and returned to England for three years of full-time art study at the Royal Academy Schools from 1881 to 1884. He traveled in Spain in 1883 with Australian artist John Russell, where he met Spanish artists Laureano Barrau and Ramon Casas who introduced him to the principles of Impressionism and plein air painting. While in London and Paris, he took in the progressing influence of painters Jules Bastien-Lepage and James Abbott McNeill Whistler.

From 1884 and through the 1890s, Roberts worked again in Victoria, in his studio at the famous studio complex of Grosvenor Chambers at 9 Collins Street, Melbourne. In 1885 he started painting and sketching excursions to what would later become outer suburbs, creating camps at Box Hill and Heidelberg, where he worked alongside McCubbin, Arthur Streeton and Charles Conder, working on representing Australia's light, heat, space and distance.

In 1896, he married 36-year-old Elizabeth (Lillie) Williamson and they had a son, Caleb. Many of his most famous paintings come from this period. Lillie Roberts was an expert maker of picture frames, and during the period 1903–1914, when Roberts painted relatively little, much of the family's income apparently came from Lillie's work. Roberts spent World War I in England assisting at a hospital. In Australia, he built a house at Kallista, near Melbourne. Elizabeth died in January 1928, and Roberts remarried, to Jean Boyes, in August 1928. He died in 1931 of cancer in Kallista near Melbourne. His ashes are buried in the churchyard at Illawarra near Longford, Tasmania .

Work

Roberts painted a considerable number of fine oil landscapes and portraits, some painted at artist camps with his friend McCubbin. Perhaps the most famous in his time were two large paintings, Shearing the Rams, now displayed in the National Gallery of Victoria and The Big Picture, displayed in Parliament House, Canberra. The Big Picture, commissioned for a fee of one thousand guineas plus expenses was a depiction of the first sitting of the Parliament of Australia in the Melbourne Exhibition Building and was an enormous work, notable for the event depicted as well as the quality of Roberts' work.

Shearing the Rams was based on a visit to a sheep station at Brocklesby in southern New South Wales, depicted the wool industry that had been Australia's first export industry and a staple of rural life. When it was first exhibited, there were immediately calls for the painting to enter a public gallery, with a Melbourne correspondent for the Sydney press stating, "if our national gallery trustees were in the least patriotic, they would purchase it." Some critics did not feel that it fitted the definition of 'high art'. However, since the wool industry was Australia's greatest export industry at the time, it was a theme with which many Australian people could identify.  In this painting, as one modern reviewer has said, Roberts put his formal art training to work, translating "the classical statuary into the brawny workers of the shearing shed".

Roberts made many other paintings showing country people working, with a similar image of the shearing sheds in The Golden Fleece (1894), a drover racing after sheep breaking away from the flock in A break away!, and with men chopping trees in Wood splitters (1886). Many of Roberts' paintings were landscapes or ideas done on small canvases that he did very quickly, such as his show at the famous 9 by 5 Impression Exhibition in Melbourne, "9 by 5" referring to the size in inches of the cigar box lids on which most of the paintings were done. Roberts had more works on display in this exhibition than anyone else.

In 1888 Roberts met Conder in Sydney and they painted together at Coogee beach. The younger Conder found these painting expeditions influential and decided to follow Roberts to Melbourne later that year to join him and Streeton at their artists' camp at Heidelberg. While Conder painted Coogee Bay emphasising on the decorative qualities of form and colour, Roberts' Holiday sketch at Coogee(1888) embodies his primary focus on the landscape's natural effects. It is an early testament to Roberts' plein-air 'impressionist' technique, which brought out the sun's glare on the bright blue sea, bleached white sand, dry grass and spindly seaside vegetation.

Legacy
Roberts' life was dramatised in the 1985 Australian mini series One Summer Again.

A "lost" painting titled Rejected was featured in a 2017 episode of the BBC series Fake or Fortune?. It was determined by experts to be a genuine Roberts, dating from his student years in London. Roberts' granddaughter considered it a self-portrait. If so, it would make it his oldest surviving self-portrait.

Retrospectives 
A retrospective toured Australia in 1996–97 and another was shown at the National Gallery of Australia from December 2015 – March 2016. Roberts was one of four Australian artists whose paintings featured in the Australia’s Impressionists exhibition at the National Gallery, London, which ran from December 2016 to March 2017; it was described as 'the first UK exhibition of its kind'.

Gallery

See also
 Australian art

References

Further reading 
 Croll, T.H.  (1946) Smike to Bulldog : letters from Sir Arthur Streeton to Tom Roberts, Sydney, Ure Smith, (Sydney: Waite and Bull)
 Gray, Anne. Tom Roberts: La Vita Con Brio pp. 11–29, and Harmonic Arrangements: Tom Roberts' Painting pp. 31–58, in (2015) Tom Roberts, National Gallery of Australia, Canberra, 
 Pearce, Barry (2000) Australian art in the Art Gallery of New South Wales, Art Gallery of New South Wales, Sydney,

External links

 Tom Roberts on Picture Australia
 Tom Roberts at the Art Gallery of New South Wales
 Tom Roberts on artistsfootsteps.com
 Tom Roberts essay at the National Gallery of Victoria

1856 births
1931 deaths
Heidelberg School
 
People from Dorchester, Dorset
Artists from Melbourne
English emigrants to Australia
19th-century Australian painters
19th-century English male artists
20th-century Australian painters
19th-century English painters
English male painters
20th-century English painters
Australian landscape painters
Australian portrait painters
Australian male painters
20th-century English male artists
People from Collingwood, Victoria
National Gallery of Victoria Art School alumni